Ronald Hugh Horsley (4 July 1932 – 20 December 2007) was a New Zealand rugby union player. He played 31 matches for the All Blacks including three internationals. After retiring as a player, Horsley went on to serve as a selector for the Nelson (1966), Golden Bay-Motueka (1967–68) and Nelson Bays (1969–70) unions. A Rotarian, Horsley served as a district governor (district 9930) from 1998 to 1999.

References

1932 births
2007 deaths
Rugby union players from Wellington City
People educated at Rongotai College
New Zealand rugby union players
New Zealand international rugby union players
Wellington rugby union players
Manawatu rugby union players
Rugby union locks
New Zealand referees and umpires